The list of ship launches in 1788 includes a chronological list of some ships launched in 1788.


References

1788
Ship launches